The Bahntower, also written as BahnTower and Bahn-Tower, (English: Railway Tower) is a 26-story, 103 m (338 ft) skyscraper on the Potsdamer Platz in Berlin, Germany. Built between 1998 and 2000, the Bahntower provides 22,000 m² (236,806 sq ft) 
of office space for the headquarters of Deutsche Bahn (English: German Railway). It is the sixth-tallest building in Berlin and the sixty-fourth tallest building in Germany.

History

In 2007 and 2008, it was reported that the small pieces of glass had fallen onto the street from cracks in the façade. This was followed in 2016 by a near-fatal incident in which a pane of glass measuring 30 cm by 150 cm (1 ft by 5 ft) fell onto a car on the street below.

The original owner of the skyscraper was Sony as part of the wider Sony Center. In February 2008, Morgan Stanley and others bought the Sony Center with the tower for €600m. In 2007, Deutsche Bahn had planned to move to a new headquarters built by Danish company 3XN outside the Berlin Hauptbahnhof, although this fell through and Deutsche Bahn extended its Bahntower contract.

When Morgan Stanley's real estate funds came into difficulties they sold their stake to South Korea's National Pension Service in 2010.

In 2016, the Bahntower was featured in the Berlin skyline scene, which is part of the Lego Architecture series.

References

Skyscrapers in Berlin
Buildings and structures in Berlin
Helmut Jahn buildings
Skyscraper office buildings in Germany
Office buildings completed in 2000
Deutsche Bahn